WORQ, known by the on-air brand of "Q90 FM", is a Christian radio radio station in Green Bay, Wisconsin.  The station is owned and operated by Lakeshore Communications, and broadcasts at 90.1 MHz on the FM dial.  WORQ is headquartered at 1253 Schuering Rd in suburban De Pere, with its transmitter located in the town of Ledgeview on Scray's Hill.  The station is primarily known for its Christian music content (emphasizing contemporary Christian in its playlist), though its schedule also features local and syndicated programming that highlights Christian talk and teaching, along with discussion programming that emphasizes a conservative, evangelical viewpoint on current events.

The frequency had previously been home to WGBP-FM, a high school station at Our Lady of Premontre High School which broadcast with 10 watts from 1975 to 1990. The station was taken silent in 1991 when the Roman Catholic Diocese of Green Bay merged Premontre, St. Joseph Academy and Abbot Pennings High School into the new one-campus Notre Dame Academy and considered the radio station an extraneous asset. WORQ, originally assigned to 88.5, was moved to 90.1; it operates on a separate license and with a much more powerful transmitter. As of September 2001, the station was one of 29 radio stations whose plays were recorded by Radio & Records to compile the Christian CHR chart.

Translators
In addition to the main station, WORQ is relayed by broadcast translators to the following parts of Wisconsin.

References

External links 

ORQ
Contemporary Christian radio stations in the United States
Radio stations established in 1994
1994 establishments in Wisconsin
ORQ